The Sgouros, also known as Sgouropoulos, Sgouromallaios, Sgouranos, Sgouris, Sgourismenos, Sgouritzis, and Sgourogiannis, was a Byzantine Greek noble family – composed of multiple branches – that originated from Nafplio.

Name 
The name of the family derives from the Greek adjective , which is indicative of wavy hair.

History 
The Sgouros family was a rich and powerful family, which first appeared in the middle of the 11th c. in Nafplio. From the very beginning right until the 15th c., it was part of the Byzantine provincial middle class. Members of the family appear to hold both political and ecclesiastical positions, and they were also distinguished as scholars, scribes, orators, etc. The Byzantinist Alexander Kazhdan, who was a notable scholar of mid-Byzantine and late Byzantine society, identified twelve representatives of the family during the reign of Alexios I Komnenos (1081-1118). With the appearance of the most prominent Sgouroi at the end of the 12th and beginning of the 13th centuries (Theodoros and Leon), the family arranged marriages with the noble family of Angeloi.

Although many Sgouroi were distinguished in public administrative positions from the time of Alexios I Komnenos, they never seem to have been members of the aristocratic court in Constantinople. Some of the most important positions held by the recorded members – mainly from 1086/1088 AD and thereafter – were those of the protospatharios, sebastos, chartoularios, proedros, domestikos, protostrator, logothetis, megas hetaireiarches, protonotarios, prokathimenos, protallagator, and sebastohypertatos (by Leon Sgouros).

Members 
There have been about 90 recorded members of the family and its branches between the 11th and 15th centuries. Of those, only four were women. The following table lists them chronologically.

Footnotes

References 

 
 
 
 

Byzantine families